Gerd Müller (1945–2021) was a German professional footballer who represented the West Germany national football team as a striker between 1966 and 1974. He scored his first international goal on 8 April 1967, when he netted four goals in a UEFA Euro 1968 qualifier against Albania. Since then, Müller become his country's all-time top scorer with 68 goals in 62 games until being overtaken by Miroslav Klose on 6 June 2014. He held the record for goals scored in FIFA World Cup tournaments between 1974 and 2006. This record was bettered in 2006 by Brazil's Ronaldo, and eight years later by fellow country man Miroslav Klose, who also broke Müller's record for goals for Germany.

Müller netted eight international hat-tricks, which is a national record and the third best in Europe behind Sweden's Sven Rydell with 9 and Portugal's Cristiano Ronaldo with 10. On half of those occasions he added a fourth goal in the same match, against Albania, Cyprus, Soviet Union and Switzerland. This tally includes back-to-back hat-tricks at the 1970 FIFA World Cup against Bulgaria and Peru, being the only player alongside Sándor Kocsis to have done so.

International goals
Scores and results list West Germany's goal tally first.

Hat-tricks

Statistics

See also 
 List of men's footballers with 50 or more international goals

References

External links

Muller, Gerd
Germany national football team records and statistics